Howard Alan Lassoff (October 15, 1955 – February 7, 2013) was an American-Israeli basketball player. He also played in Israel for 14 years.

Biography
Initially interested in tennis, Lassoff grew to 6 feet 10 inches tall. He became interested in basketball while a student at Lower Merion High School in Lower Merion, Pennsylvania. He became the starting center on the Lower Merion Team. In 1974 his high school team competed in the Central League first Half Championship. Lower Merion lost in the final game.

While in high school, Lassoff starred for the US in the 1977 Maccabiah Games in Israel, where his coach was Dolph Schayes and with Danny Schayes, Ernie Grunfeld, and Willie Sims also on the team it won a gold medal.

Lassoff went on to play college basketball on a scholarship at NCAA Division I American University in Washington, D.C. His coach was Philadelphian Jimmy Lynam, who would eventually coach at St. Joseph's University in Philadelphia and in the NBA for the Portland Trail Blazers and the Philadelphia 76ers. He was a four-year varsity letterman and a three-year starting center.  In his senior year, the American University Eagles went to the East Coast Conference Championships game, losing to Temple University. Lassoff graduated with a BS degree in Criminal Justice.

Professional career in Israel
After graduating from American University, Lassoff went on to have a 14-year professional career in Israel. He played in the European League. He played for Hapoel Haifa and was a six-time Israeli Basketball League Champion with Maccabi Tel Aviv. In 1981 and 1986, his team lost in the finals to the Tracer Milan team. Bob McAdoo and Mike D'Antoni played for Milan. Lassoff later said that McAdoo was the most difficult player to guard in his entire career. Lassoff went on to become the starting center for the Israeli national basketball team from 1982 to 1991, and played in over 100 games for the national team. He played many games against some of the finest basketball players in the world, many of whom would play in the NBA. He guarded players such as Bob McAdoo, Rik Smits, Vlade Divac, Arvydas Sabonis, Toni Kukoč, and Drazen Petrovic.

Lassoff was inducted into the Philadelphia Jewish Sports Hall of Fame, class of 2011.

Personal life
Lassoff was born in Philadelphia to Irving and Hilda Lassoff. He was the second of four children. He had an older sister Debbie and two younger brothers, Barry and Louis. He spent his early years living inside the city of Philadelphia. Eventually the Lassoff family moved to Lower Merion, a suburb of Philadelphia, where his love of basketball began.

While living in Israel, Lassoff joined the Israel army and served in the Israeli Defense Forces for 18 months. He remained in the reserves until 1993. After retiring from his professional career, he returned to the Philadelphia area. He remained active in basketball, playing in local leagues.

Lassoff died on February 7, 2013, at Lankenau Medical Center in Wynnewood, Pennsylvania. He was survived by his longtime partner, Beth Bressler, and two children, Alex, a soldier in the US Army, and Josh, an aspiring musician and college student. Also surviving him were his grandson Avi, as well as his parents Hilda and Irv Lassoff, sister Debbie, his two brothers Barry and Louis, and many nieces and nephews.

See also
List of select Jewish basketball players

References

1955 births
2013 deaths
American Eagles men's basketball players
American expatriate basketball people in Israel
American men's basketball players
Basketball players from Philadelphia
Hapoel Haifa B.C. players
Israeli American
Israeli men's basketball players
Israeli soldiers
Jewish men's basketball players
Lower Merion High School alumni
Maccabi Tel Aviv B.C. players
Jewish American sportspeople
Maccabiah Games basketball players of the United States
Competitors at the 1977 Maccabiah Games
Maccabiah Games gold medalists for the United States
Maccabiah Games medalists in basketball
1986 FIBA World Championship players
21st-century American Jews